The Douglas Circuit was a motor racing street circuit in Douglas, the capital and largest town of the Isle of Man and was re-configured each year until 1937.  The first Grand Prix, titled  "Mannin Beg & Mannin Moar" (English: Small Man & Big Man) was held in 1933 on a  street circuit  which repeated as II and III Mannin Moar on different circuit layouts until 1935. In 1936 the circuit changed again for the IV RAC International Light Car Race and a last time for the (1937) V RAC International Light Car Race.

Racing at Douglas resumed in post-war 1947 on the 1936  circuit configuration with the first Manx Cup and the 9th British Empire Trophy. This circuit variant remained largely unchanged until 1953, the 15th British Empire Trophy and last event held on the Douglas street circuit.

Circuit history

Douglas circuit by year

Layout history

References

External links
 British Empire Trophy - 1932-1992
 1949 British Empire Trophy
 1950 British Empire Trophy
 XII British Empire Trophy
Douglas Circuit (1937-1953) on Google Maps (Historic Formula 1 Tracks)

Pre-World Championship Grand Prix circuits
Defunct motorsport venues in the United Kingdom